Hannah Vester (born 2 May 2006) is a German rhythmic gymnast. She won silver in the senior team category at the 2022 World Championships.

Career 
Vester made the move from being an individual training at TB 1889 Oppau to the rooster of the national group in February 2022, her first senior year. She was selected to perform in the 5 hoops exercise at the 2022 Rhythmic Gymnastics European Championships in Tel Aviv, Israel, scoring 30.150, the group came in 12th place in the all-around. In the team ranking (individual and group), the German team placed 5th.  In late August she competed at the World Cup in Cluj-Napoca, winning bronze in the 3 ribbons + 2 balls' final. The following month she participated at the 2022 World Championships in Sofia, Bulgaria, the group made mistakes in the 5 hoops routine (that was scored 25.950) relegated them in 14th place in the All-Around, but they qualified for the 3 ribbons + 2 balls' final with the 6th score, the same place they ended up in the final. Following Bulgaria and Israel's withdrawal Germany was able to medal in the team competition, Hannah and her teammates Anja Kosan, Daniella Kromm, Alina Oganesyan, Francine Schöning and the two individuals Margarita Kolosov and Darja Varfolomeev were awarded silver for their results.

References 

2006 births
Living people
German rhythmic gymnasts
Medalists at the Rhythmic Gymnastics World Championships
21st-century German women